The City of Gosford is a former local government area located on the Central Coast region, in the state of New South Wales, Australia. The incorporation of Gosford dates back to 1886 when the Town of Gosford was proclaimed as the Borough of Gosford, becoming the Municipality of Gosford from 1906. In 1908, the Gosford Municipality merged into Erina Shire which covered the remaining Central Coast area outside of Gosford, but regained its independence in 1936. From 1 January 1947, local government in the Central Coast region was reorganised, creating Gosford Shire and Wyong Shire, and the final boundaries of Gosford City Council date from this period. From 1 January 1980, Gosford Shire was granted city status, becoming the City of Gosford. On 12 May 2016 the Minister for Local Government amalgamated the City of Gosford and Wyong Shire Councils. The Central Coast Council was established on the same day, covering the combined areas.

The City was bounded to the east by the Tasman Sea, to the south by Broken Bay and the Hawkesbury River, to the west by the Great North Road where it encircled the Dharug National Park taking in the catchment area of the Mangrove Creek Dam, before heading south–east towards the coast, north of Forresters Beach.

The last Mayor of the Gosford City Council was Cr. Lawrie McKinna, an independent politician.

Suburbs and localities
The local government area included a moderately densely populated coastal strip that extended northward from the Hawkesbury River, and an extensive sparsely-populated region to the west that was largely native bush. The towns and villages located within the City of Gosford were:

History

Early history
The traditional Aboriginal inhabitants of the lands now known as the Brisbane Water were the Guringai people of the Eora nation. The Darkingung people occupied large areas inland west towards Rylstone, and north to Cessnock and Wollombi.

In 1811, the Governor of New South Wales, Lachlan Macquarie, gave the first land grant in the region to William Nash, a former marine of the First Fleet. No further grants were made in the area until 1821. In 1839 Governor Sir George Gipps named the town of Gosford after his friend, The Earl of Gosford. In 1840, the Brisbane Water Police District was proclaimed covering the area from the Hawkesbury River to Lake Macquarie and which administered local government under the control of magistrates. In 1843, the Brisbane Water District Council was proclaimed on the same boundaries as the Police District, and replaced the appointed magistrates with an elected council as part of an early attempt to establish local government administration throughout the colony. This experiment in local government was not very successful, with much public opposition focused on the issue of increased taxation, and a lack of oversight and faulty administration led to the collapse of many of these District Councils. The Brisbane Water District Council had ceased to exist by 1855, and the NSW Parliament passed the Municipalities Act in 1858, which allowed for the creation of Municipalities and Boroughs if a petition of as few as 50 signatures was presented to the government. However, no petition was ever sent from the residents of Brisbane Water to the government under this act, and local matters reverted to the police magistrates for determination.

Gosford Borough
Under the succeeding Municipalities Act, 1867, which allowed for residents to petition the Colonial Government for incorporation, a petition signed by 59 Gosford residents, amongst a population of approximately 1,000 at the time, was sent to the Governor on 10 June 1886 requesting the establishment of the "Borough of Gosford" with two wards, East Gosford and West Gosford. The petition was subsequently accepted and on 11 November 1886, the "Borough of Gosford" was proclaimed by the Governor Lord Carrington, with an area of 1,840 acres in and around the Town of Gosford. The first election for the six aldermen and two auditors was held at Gosford Courthouse on 1 February 1887, and the first mayor, John Bennett Whiteway, was elected at the first Council meeting on 20 February 1887. From 1888, the Borough Council meetings were held in the Gosford School of Arts building at 38 Mann Street.

Erina Shire
The remaining area of the Brisbane Water Police District outside of Gosford continued to be administered by the police magistrates until 1906. From 7 March 1906, this area became the Erina Shire, when it was proclaimed by the NSW Government Gazette along with 132 other new Shires as a result of the passing of the Local Government (Shires) Act 1905. On 16 May 1906, the Shire was divided in to three Ridings (A, B, C) and five temporary Councillors were appointed (John Bourke of Kincumber, John Martin Moroney of Woy Woy, Harold Stanley Robinson of Penang, Manasseh Ward of Gosford, and Alexander Wilkinson of Wyong). The Temporary Council first met at Gosford Courthouse on 13 June 1906 and Manasseh Ward was elected as the Chairman. The first election was held on 24 November 1906 and the first meeting of the elected nine-member Council was held at the Gosford Courthouse on 5 December 1906, with Councillor Ward elected to continue serving as the first Shire President. 

With the coming into effect of the Local Government Act, 1906, the Borough of Gosford became the Municipality of Gosford, as well as the power of Councils to petition the government to dissolve and merge with other Councils. In July 1907 a petition from the Municipality of Gosford was published in the Government Gazette requesting to merge with Erina Shire, the first Council to do so under the 1906 act. However, owing to objections from the Wyong Progress Association and the Erina Shire Council, a public inquiry was established by the Secretary for Public Works, where it was heard that the Gosford Municipality was in debt and desired to merge with Erina to resolve its financial issues. Despite objections, the commissioner returned a recommendation for the merger and a proposal for a six-ward model was considered and accepted at a conference held on 30 September 1907. The proposal for a six-ward Erina Shire with Gosford becoming F Riding was subsequently proclaimed and came into effect on 23 January 1908. The new Shire Council Chambers on Mann Street, Gosford, were officially opened on 4 May 1912.

In 1921, a group of ratepayers angered by what they saw as a general neglect of their local area, formed an organisation to work towards the separation of the Woy Woy Peninsula area from Erina Shire. On 27 April 1928 a proposal for separation was received and the Shire of Woy Woy was subsequently proclaimed on 1 August 1928.

Gosford Municipality and Brisbane Water County Council

In March 1936, three Councillors of Erina Shire were dismissed from office for having held office while subject to a special disqualification, and it was also revealed that Council staff had not been paid since February. As the Council could not meet due to lack of quorum, on 24 March 1936 the Minister for Local Government, Eric Spooner, dismissed the Council and appointed an Administrator, B. C. Hughes. Spooner commissioned Hughes to undertake an inquiry into the administration of Erina Shire and, following a January petition from Gosford and Point Clare residents for a new Gosford municipality, also to investigate the question of the separation of Gosford from the Shire. The inquiry found in favour of a separation of Gosford, which was accepted by Spooner, and Erina Shire was divided again to re-form the Municipality of Gosford on 24 October 1936, including the areas of the former Gosford Municipality abolished in 1908 and also new areas from Narara to Woy Woy and Point Clare. A nine-member provisional council was appointed the same day, and at the first meeting on 24 October 1936 William Calman Grahame was elected as the first Mayor and Charles Staples, the former Mayor of Woy Woy, was elected Deputy Mayor. Following the first Council election on 23 January 1937, Grahame and Staples were re-elected to their positions on 29 January.

In March 1938, the first permanent supply of town water was delivered to Gosford, with the opening of a new water supply direct from Lower Mooney Dam on the Mooney Mooney Creek. On 22 April 1939, the Gosford Council Chambers on Mann Street, designed in the Inter-war Art Deco style by architects Loyal Figgis and Virgil Cizzio and built by A. E. Catterall at a cost of £5,785, was officially opened by the Minister for Local Government, Eric Spooner.

Following significant debate about the provision of electricity undertakings across the Central Coast, including over the split between Erina Shire and Gosford, on 16 October 1942 Gosford Municipality combined with the Shires of Erina and Woy Woy to form the Brisbane Water County Council to provide electricity to the combined area of the three councils. The County Council operated as an electricity and gas supplier and retailer and was managed by representatives of the three councils. The County Council operated until its amalgamation with the Sydney County Council from 1 January 1980.

Gosford and Wyong

In June 1945, Erina Shire resolved to investigate the reconstitution of local government on the Central Coast into two shires and following further discussions a formal proposal was presented to the Minister for Local Government, Joseph Cahill, in October 1945. Nevertheless the proposal proved divisive, with Gosford and the Wyong section of Erina Shire in favour and the rest of Erina Shire and Woy Woy Shire opposed. The formal government inquiry subsequently supported the proposal and in April 1946, Cahill notified the councils of his intention to proceed. On 1 January 1947, part of Erina Shire, all of Woy Woy Shire and the Municipality of Gosford formed Gosford Shire, and the remainder of Erina Shire north and east of Kulnura, Central Mangrove and Lisarow formed Wyong Shire.

In August 1948, Gosford Shire established the first Library Service, with branches opening on 13 August at Woy Woy (in the old Council Chambers) and on 16 August on Mann Street next to the Council Chambers. An expanded Gosford Branch Library was opened in 1951 by the Minister for Education, Bob Heffron. New Libraries were subsequently opened at Gosford (Donnison St, 1969), Umina (1983), Kariong (2002) and at Kincumber, Wyoming and Erina (2003). 

On 23 February 1961, Gosford Shire Council resolved to suspend the Shire Clerk, Nigel George Howes, noting dissatisfaction with his work and that they no longer had confidence in him. However, Howes later gained an Equity Court ruling that placed a suspension on Council's dismissal of him until a public inquiry could be held to investigate the Council resolution. Awaiting the results of the inquiry, Howes returned to work in March and was suspended again on 6 June 1961, with the Council then airing various allegations in the inquiry against him. On 5 August 1961, the Council was brought into disrepute again when Councillor Donald Norman Lamont was convicted on 11 counts (fined £450) for three breaches of the Local Government Act 1919, including voting and participating in debate on several developments in which he had a significant undeclared financial interest. As a result of these events, the Minister for Local Government, Pat Hills, announced that due to the failure of council to resolve these matters and the loss of public confidence in the council, he would dismiss the Council and appoint an administrator. Subsequently, on 20 September 1961 Hills dismissed the Council and appointed the Chief Inspector of Local Government Accounts, Henry William Dane, as administrator. On the dismissal, Councillor Dangar laid the blame for the dysfunction at the feet of the acting shire president, Jack Roberts: "As soon as Councillor Barrett [the shire president] became ill, you made no effort to work with Mr Howes and you had him sacked within two weeks." The inquiry was concluded in October 1961, with Special Magistrate E. R. Harvey finding that there was "no justification" for Council's actions to suspend the Shire Clerk. Not long after, Dane reinstated Howes to duty as Shire Clerk, and the Council would remain under administration until December 1965.

In 1974–1976, the 1939 Gosford Council Council Chambers were demolished and replaced by the Gosford Administration Building, a Brutalist style tower with a pre-cast concrete facade designed by prominent architects, McConnell Smith & Johnston. On 9 November 1979, the Shire of Gosford was proclaimed as the City of Gosford, with effect from 1 January 1980.

In January 1997, the Mayor of Gosford, Tony Sansom, was briefly threatened with dismissal from office when a Magistrate ordered that he be removed from office as a result of litigation that alleged irregularities in moving the dates of the September 1996 mayoral election. However, Sansom, who described the magristrates ruling as "bizarre" appealed the decision to the Supreme Court. On 4 July 1997, the Supreme Court overturned the magistrate's ruling, with Justice Michael Grove noting that the ruling was an "error of law".

Establishment of Central Coast Council
On 12 May 2016, with the release of the Local Government (Council Amalgamations) Proclamation 2016, Central Coast Council was formed from Wyong Shire and Gosford City councils. The first meeting of the Central Coast Council was held at the Wyong Civic Centre on 25 May 2016, with meetings alternating between Gosford and Wyong.

Demographics
At the 2011 Census, there were  people in Gosford local government area, making the area the twelfth most populous local government area in New South Wales, and the twenty–fourth most populous local government area in Australia. Of these 48.2% were male and 51.8% were female. Aboriginal and Torres Strait Islander people made up 2.2% of the population. The median age of people in the City of Gosford was 42 years; significantly higher than the national median of 37 years. Children aged 0 – 14 years made up 18.7% of the population and people aged 65 years and over made up 19.2% of the population, compared to 14.0% being the national median of people aged over 65 years. Of people in the area aged 15 years and over, 48.6% were married and 13.8% were either divorced or separated. With a higher proportion of elderly residents than the national median, the data reflects the colloquial term for the area as God's Waiting Room.

Population growth in the City of Gosford between the 2001 Census and the 2006 Census was 2.67%; and in the subsequent five years to the 2011 Census, population growth was 2.71%. When compared with total population growth of Australia for the same periods, being 5.78% and 8.32% respectively, population growth in the Gosford local government area was nearly one third below the national average. The median weekly income for residents within the City of Gosford was approximately 10% lower than the national average.

At the 2011 Census, the proportion of residents in the Gosford local government area who stated their ancestry as Australian or Anglo-Saxon exceeded 78% of all residents. In excess of 60% of all residents in the City of Gosford nominated a religious affiliation with Christianity at the 2011 Census, which was significantly higher than the national average of 50.2%. Meanwhile, as at the Census date, compared to the national average, households in the Gosford local government area had a lower than average proportion (7.5%) where two or more languages are spoken (national average was 20.4%); and a higher proportion (89.9%) where English only was spoken at home (national average was 76.8%).

Council

Final composition and election method
Gosford City Council was composed of ten Councillors elected proportionally as one entire ward. All Councillors were elected for a fixed four-year term of office. The last election was held on 8 September 2012, and the makeup of the Council was as follows: The Mayor and Deputy Mayor were elected annually by the Councillors at a special meeting of the Council in September. The final Council, elected in 2012 and abolished in 2016, in order of election, were:

Mayors and Shire Presidents

Mayors 1886–1908

Mayors 1936–1947

Shire Presidents 1947–1980, and Mayors 1980–2016

Council executives

Coat of arms

References

External links
Gosford City Council website (Archived)
 NSW Department of Local Government: Suburbs and Towns in Gosford Council (includes map)

Gosford
Gosford
Central Coast (New South Wales)
Gosford
Gosford
Gosford
Gosford
Gosford
Gosford
Gosford
Shire Presidents and Mayors of Gosford